Mbuya is a hill in southeastern Kampala, the capital city of Uganda. The name also applies to the upscale residential neighborhood that sits on that hill, as well as the government military installations located there.

Location

Mbuya is located in Nakawa Division, one of the five administrative divisions of Kampala. It is bordered by Kyambogo to the north, Kinawataka and Kireka to the northeast, Butabika and Biina to the east, Mutungo to the southeast, Port Bell, Kitintale and Bugoloobi to the south, Namuwongo to the southwest, Nakawa to the west and Ntinda to the northwest. The coordinates of Mbuya are: 0°19'39.0"N, 32°37'48.0"E (Latitude: 0.3275; Longitude: 32.6300).

History
Before Europeans came to Uganda, Mbuya was the seat of Kaggo, a Luganda word meaning whip. Kaggo is the title of the County Chief of Kyaddondo, then one of the 20 counties of Buganda. Today Kyaddondo surrounds Kampala to the north and east and includes most of present-day Kampala. The county  headquarters were eventually moved to Kasangati and Mbuya was converted into an upscale residential and commercial area.

Notable residents
Sam Odaka – former Foreign Minister of Uganda (1964–1971)

Points of interest
The following points of interest are located in Mbuya:
 The headquarters of the Uganda Ministry of Defense
 Mbuya Military Referral Hospital - one of two military hospitals in Uganda; the other is located in Bombo
 The Embassy of the Vatican
 The Embassy of Cuba
 The residence of the Papal Nuncio
 The Consulate of the Republic of Ghana
 The residence of the High Commissioner of Trinidad and Tobago
 Our Lady of Africa Catholic cathedral
 Reach Out Mbuya HIV/AIDS Initiative

See also
Nakawa Division
UPDF
KCCA
Uganda hospitals

References

External links
Kampala City Guide
"Gun Men Attack Mbuya Army Barracks"

Nakawa Division
Neighborhoods of Kampala